The Dutch public broadcasting system is a group of organizations that are responsible for public service television and radio broadcasting in the Netherlands. It is composed of the Nederlandse Publieke Omroep (NPO) foundation, which acts as its governing body, and a number of public broadcasters. The Dutch Media Act 2008 regulates how air time is divided and puts the administration of the public broadcasting system in the hands of the NPO Board of Directors.

In addition to the national broadcasters, there are also regional and local broadcasters in the Netherlands.

Unlike most other countries' public broadcasting organizations – which are either national corporations (such as the BBC and France Télévisions / Radio France), federations of regional public-law bodies (for example, ARD, SRG SSR) or governmental and member-based institutions with their own channels and facilities (such as PBS) – those in the Netherlands are member-based broadcasting associations that share common facilities. This arrangement has its origins in the system developed in the Netherlands early in the 20th century, known as pillarisation. Under this system the different religious and political streams of Dutch society (Catholics, Protestants, socialists, etc.) all have their own separate associations, newspapers, sports clubs, educational institutions, and also broadcasting organizations.

Their stated aim is to give a voice to each social group in multicultural Dutch society. The number of hours allocated to each broadcaster corresponds roughly to the number of members each organization can recruit (although this does not apply to NOS and NTR – see below). Since 2000, the system has been financed out of general taxation rather than from broadcast receiver licence fees. This is supplemented by a limited amount of on-air advertising (provided by STER), which has been allowed since 1967.

Nearly all viewers in the Netherlands receive most of their linear TV via cable, IPTV (DSL or fiber) or satellite systems. Regional public TV exists in parallel to the national system described below. Commercial television in the Netherlands began in 1989, with the Luxembourg-based RTL 4. In 1992, the government of the Netherlands legalised commercial TV, and many new commercial channels have become established since then.

Finance
Every year, the Dutch public broadcasting system is allocated funds from the Ministry of Education, Culture and Science. In 2018 the allocation was 794 million Euro with yearly revenues from advertising averaging around 200 million Euro. 
The cost to each adult Dutch citizen is approximately 45 Euro per year, which is on a similar level to VRT in Flemish Belgium (46 Euro). In comparison, the BBC in the United Kingdom gets its revenue from an annual household licence fee of 159 GBP, approx 188 Euro. As of 2020, the BBC's average annual licence fee income is 3.7 Billion GBP and the UK adult population is about 53 million (total population is 68 million), so the average cost per person is about 70 GBP.

History

The closed system (1920–1960)
Since the very beginning in the early 1920s, public broadcasting in the Netherlands has been split into different broadcasting associations with their members composed of listeners and viewers. These associations were based on the different ideological sections of Dutch society, called Verzuiling (pillarisation). Catholics, Protestants and Socialists were the first groups to create their own institutions, including schools, hospitals, trades unions and political parties. When radio in the Netherlands started in the 1920s the existing groups quickly created their own broadcasting associations, producing programmes for the primary radio network, Hilversum 1. The first to start was the liberal AVRO, founded as radio broadcaster Hilversumsche Draadlooze Omroep (HDO) by the NSF transmitter factory in Huizen on 8 July 1923. The first regular radio broadcasts started on 21 July 1923. Airtime was rented to the various religious and political radio organisations—the Protestant NCRV, the Roman Catholic KRO, the Socialist VARA and the liberal Protestant VPRO.

Under the system of pillarisation in place at the time, each audience group was faithful to its pillar's broadcasting company. The programmes were funded by the associations' members. KRO and NCRV started their own station in 1927 with a transmitter also located in Huizen and built by the NSF.

In 1930 the government regulated equal airtime for all organisations on the two stations, and the semi-public broadcasting system was born.  As a result, AVRO lost most of its airtime then (50%) to VARA and VPRO.

The radio licence fee was introduced by the Nazi occupation during World War II; the different broadcasting groups were urged by the Government to co-operate more with each other, and the Netherlands Radio Union (Dutch:Nederlandse Radio Unie) was formed, producing joint programmes.

The Netherlands Radio Union (Nederlandse Radio Unie) was one of 23 founding organisations of the European Broadcasting Union (EBU) in 1950. (The role of Dutch representative to the European Broadcasting Union was later inherited by NOS, formed in 1969, and has since September 2002 been the responsibility of NPO.)

1951 saw the introduction of television, and a similar union was founded: the Netherlands Television Foundation (Nederlandse Televisie Stichting), supplying studios and facilities for the associations. These broadcasts would air the Nederland 1 channel; a second channel, Nederland 2, launched in 1964.

The closed system opens up (1960–1990)

With the arrival of illegal offshore commercial radio stations, such as Radio Veronica in 1960 and Radio Noordzee in 1964, Hilversum 3 was launched in 1965 to provide a legal alternative and to steer audiences towards the public service channels. Hilversum 3, along with the other two networks, were renamed as Radio 1, Radio 2 and Radio 3 towards the late 1980s.

In 1967 a Broadcasting Act was passed, providing for an official framework to supply the public with information, entertainment, culture and education, with time allocated to appointed broadcasting associations based on the number of members each association had. This allowed other organisations access to the public system, including the former commercial unlicensed broadcasters TROS and Veronica and the evangelical Christian EO to diversify programming. Advertising revenue was added, handled by an independent agency called STER.

The Netherlands Radio Union (NRU) and the Netherlands Television Foundation (NTS) merged to form the NOS, charged with providing news and sport programmes as well as with general co-ordination of the public system.

A new Media Act in 1988 meant that broadcasters were no longer obliged to use production facilities supplied by the NOS. These facilities were spun off into a new private company, NOB. Programme quotas were introduced: associations had to produce:
 25% news and information programmes
 25% entertainment and general programming
 20% cultural
 5% educational

A new media regulator (Commissariaat voor de Media) was created to regulate the public and private networks. The regulator could impose fines, with a programming fund designed to encourage cultural broadcasts. New rules for the cable industry were also introduced: the public networks were designated must-carry status.

The start of private media (1990–2000)
In anticipation of the launch of new commercial satellite channels, a third television network, Nederland 3, launched in April 1988. Luxembourg-based RTL-Véronique began broadcasting in October 1989. In 1992, the government of the Netherlands legalised commercial television, and a number of new commercial channels were established. As a result, the market share of public television had fallen from 85% to 50% by 1994. Veronica decided to leave the public system after 20 years to become a commercial broadcaster. By 1996 the arrival of more private channels from RTL and SBS had further reduced the market share of the public networks to 40%.

With the change in the television landscape, changes were made to strengthen the public sector. Its financial revenues were improved by an increase in advertising time and the indexation of the licence fee to the cost of living.
In 1995 the programming duties of the Nederlandse Omroep Stichting (Netherlands Broadcasting Foundation, NOS) were split in two, with the creation of the NPS (Netherlands Programming Foundation). NOS was charged with providing news, sport and coverage of important live events, while the NPS provided cultural and children's programming.

The previous NOS management was replaced by a three-person board, charged with developing strategies and responsibility for all public output. Programming co-ordinators were appointed for each of the television and radio networks, and channel identities were created, largely replacing the varying on-air presentation of the pillar broadcasters. The broadcasting associations also have a degree of input through a Supervisory Board.

The market share of the public networks stabilized in 1999 at 38%, with the entry of a new broadcasting association, the first in 25 years. BNN (Bart's News Network, later Bart's Neverending Network) replaced Veronica as programme supplier to teenagers and young adults.

Diversification, expansion and the creation of the NPO (2000–2010)
Under the new "open system" any company can become a broadcasting company and obtain radio and TV airtime. The only requirement is to request official status from the government and to have enough members. Broadcasting companies in the Netherlands must ensure every year they have enough members to retain their official status, and most of them sell TV guides or other magazines and make every subscriber a member of their organization.

Many people question whether the current system is still appropriate in this age of digital broadcasting. There were plans in the run-up to the 2002 general election to change the way broadcast companies are selected, and to abolish the member-based system completely. Vocal critics included Pim Fortuyn, the assassinated leader of his own right-wing party. However, currently the system is still the way it always has been.

Prior to the 2002 reorganization, the Dutch public broadcasting system was managed by NOS. In 2002, it was put under control of "Nederlandse Publieke Omroep" (Dutch Public Broadcasting foundation), abbreviated as NPO.

From September 2010, Minister of Culture and Education Ronald Plasterk approved the entry of new broadcasting associations PowNed and Wakker Nederland (WNL) into the public broadcasting system. Another association, MAX, was given full recognition and can increase its broadcasting hours. Conversely, LLiNK was withdrawn and no longer has access. Meanwhile, the NPS, Teleac and the RVU institutions merged into one public broadcaster, the NTR, delivering cultural, educational, current affairs and children's programmes to the public system.

Cuts to the public system (2010–present)
On 18 January 2010, Henk Hagoort, chairman of the NPO Management Board, announced a scaling back of the number of broadcasting associations using the public airwaves to 15 by 2015. He also warned of the threat of political parties which could influence programming in the public broadcasting system.

In September 2010 cuts to the public system took effect, with the existing eleven full-time broadcasting associations facing decisions about their futures. Part-time Islamic broadcasters NMO, NIO and the merged SMON were all withdrawn from the public system.

In March 2012, NPO announced the closure of two of its digital television channels, Geschiedenis 24 (History 24) and Consumenten 24 (Consumer 24) on 1 April. History programmes transferred to Holland Doc 24 and consumer programmes are looked after by VARA via an online portal.

Future plans (from 2016)
From 2015, Netherlands Public Broadcasting will face a budget shortfall of 200 million euro. To address this, the number of broadcasting associations within the public system is to be reduced. Mergers and/or cooperations have been confirmed between existing broadcasting associations:

List of broadcasters

Member based
There are currently eleven member-based broadcasting associations:
 AVROTROS (Algemene Vereniging Radio Omroep - Televisie en Radio Omroep Stichting): A merger between the oldest broadcaster in the system and the most popular general broadcaster, its mission emphasizes its liberal roots by "promoting freedom" and with a focus on entertainment. The AVRO was founded as HDO in the 1923. The TROS originated from a commercial unlicensed TV station. The TROS was known for giving particularly much attention to Dutch popular music and promoting Dutch artists. From 2010 it took charge of the organisation of the Netherlands participation in the Eurovision Song Contest.
 BNNVARA (Bart's Neverending Network and Vereniging van Arbeiders Radio Amateurs): BNN is founded by Bart de Graaff, its programming is primarily aimed at a younger audience, often dealing with pop culture and shock value. The VARA is a large broadcaster with a left-wing labour oriented background. VARA broadcasts popular programmes such as De Wereld Draait Door.
 eo (Evangelische Omroep): A Protestant Christian broadcaster, often broadcasting programs of an evangelical nature.
 HUMAN (Humanistische Omroep): Broadcasts from a humanist perspective.
 kro-ncrv (Katholieke Radio Omroep and Nederlandse Christelijke Radio Vereniging): The kro is a Catholic broadcaster. Has predominantly non-religious programming and tends to be liberal. The ncrv is the main Christian broadcaster.
 MAX: airs programming aimed at viewers over 50.
 POW (Publieke Omroep Weldenkend Nederland En Dergelijke): Launched in 2010, the broadcaster is a spin-off of the inflammatory political blog GeenStijl.nl.
 vpro (originally: Vrijzinnig Protestantse Radio Omroep): Quirky, independently minded broadcaster with a progressive liberal background. Much original intellectual cultural programming.
 WNL (Wakker Nederland): Right-wing conservative broadcaster initiated by the De Telegraaf newspaper group.
 Omroep ZWART: Provisionally recognised as an left-wing, liberal broadcaster since 1 January 2022, also co-operates with BNNVARA on certain programming.
 : Provisionally recognised as a right-wing broadcaster since 1 January 2022.

Task based
In addition, there are now two official "public service broadcasters" created under the Media Act of 1988:
 NOS (Nederlandse Omroep Stichting): Focusing on news, parliamentary reporting, and sport, NOS's stated aim is to be objective. It is responsible for the "NOS Journaal", the main (daytime/evening) news bulletins on the public channels. It coordinates the other public broadcasters and creates most of the teletext pages. Until 2002, NOS served as the Dutch representative to the EBU. That role has now been taken over by the npo (Nederlandse Publieke Omroep - Netherlands Public Broadcasting).
 ntr A new public broadcaster formed in September 2010. Specialising in providing news and information as well as cultural, educational, children's, and ethnic programming. NTR was formed by a merger of the former public broadcasters NPS, Teleac and RVU.

Other
 Omrop Fryslân (Frisian Broadcasting): Frisian regional broadcaster allocated airtime on the national television channels.
 Zendtijd voor Politieke Partijen: Airtime for commercials of political parties which are represented in the Dutch parliament.
  socutera (Stichting ter bevordering van Sociale en Culturele doeleinden door Televisie en Radio): Small broadcaster broadcasting promotions related to culture and charity.
  Ster: Independent agency handling advertising exclusively on Netherlands Public Broadcasting's television, radio and online outlets. Created by the Broadcasting Act 1967 to prevent commercial influence on programming. Currently, income from advertising forms a third of the annual Media Budget to the public system.

Former broadcasters
 Concertzender (1998–2009):  Classical music. Left the national public system after Netherlands Public Broadcasting stopped financing the station in order to launch Radio 6. It continues to broadcast independently of the NPO.
 LLiNK (2005–2010): Former broadcaster. Had public access withdrawn in 2010 due to Netherlands Public Broadcasting and the Commission for Media withdrawing financial support and stopped broadcasting at the end of 2010. Made television programmes about subjects such as the environment and human rights.
 MO (Moslim Omroep) (2013-2015): Small Islamic broadcaster, withdrawn from the public system in October 2015.
 NIO (Nederlandse Islamitische Omroep) (2005–2010): Small Islamic broadcaster, withdrawn from the public system in March 2010.
 NMO (Nederlandse Moslim Omroep) (1993–2010): Small Islamic broadcaster, slightly more progressive than the NIO. Withdrawn from the public system in March 2010.
 NPS (Nederlandse Programma Stichting) (1995–2010): Merged into NTR. Formerly part of the NOS, but split off in 1995. Produced cultural, factual, youth and minority-oriented programming. Produced the Dutch version of Sesame Street. It was considered to put the NOS and NPS back together in 2008, but that plan was scrapped.
 RVU (Radio Volks Universiteit)  (1930–2010): Was a small educational broadcaster with a non-secular non-ideological nature. Member of Educom, a partnership with Teleac/NOT, merged into NTR.
 Teleac (Televisie-academie)  (1996–2010): Former larger educational broadcaster, merged into NTR. Produced courses on television and television for schools. Member of Educom, a partnership with RVU.
 Veronica (1975–1995): Former unlicensed radio broadcaster, entered the public system as a broadcasting association in 1975; its first programme was a classical music show on Hilversum 4. Known for targeting teenagers and young adults. Withdrew in 1995 and became a commercial company as part of the Holland Media Groep. The TV and magazine departments are now owned by Sanoma and Talpa Media Holding. The Radio department is now part of the Sky Radio Group.

Television
The broadcasting organisations produce programmes for three main television channels and eight digital channels. Since 4 July 2009 the three main channels have been simulcast in 1080i high-definition. Most programming in the early stages is upscaled as in time more programmes will become available in native HD. In 2008 a temporary high-definition version of the Nederland 1 channel was created from 2 June to 24 August, to broadcast Euro 2008, the 2008 Tour de France, and the 2008 Summer Olympics in HD before the launch of the permanent HD service.

National
 NPO 1: News, current affairs, sports and family.
 NPO 2: Arts, culture, politics, documentaries, news, current affairs and religion.
 NPO 3: Oriented towards youth and innovative television.
 NPO Zappelin: Block for children aged 2–6, broadcast on NPO 3.
 NPO Zapp: Block for children aged 6–12, broadcast on NPO 3.

Digital
Available via digital cable, satellite, and internet.
 NPO 1 Extra – Entertainment archive channel
 NPO 2 Extra – Documentaries, Arts and culture
 NPO Politiek en Nieuws – Parliamentary coverage, current affairs and news

International
 BVN – (Het Beste van NPO) Entertainment channel, available worldwide by satellite and cable. Programmes are provided from Netherlands Public Broadcasting and the NOS. Before 2021, the channel was jointly run by NPO and the Flemish public broadcaster VRT (The BVN symbolised Het Beste van Vlaanderen en Nederland; or "The best of Flanders and the Netherlands"); programming from Radio Netherlands Worldwide ended in 2012.

Radio

National
 NPO Radio 1 – News, current affairs and sports coverage
 NPO Radio 2 – Pop music from the 1980s and 1990s (1960s and 1970s hits may also air)
 NPO 3FM – Pop, rock and dance music for a youth audience
 NPO Radio 4 – Classical music
 NPO Radio 5 – Pop music from the 1960s to 1980s
 NPO Radio 2 Soul & Jazz  – Soul, Jazz and World music with cultural information
 FunX – urban and ethnic music for a young audience. Run as a collaboration with local public radio foundations in Amsterdam, Utrecht, The Hague and Rotterdam. Programmes are made by the station (as opposed to the national member system), but is funded by Netherlands Public Broadcasting and takes NOS news bulletins.

Digital and web channels
The following digital and web channels are available via NPO Radioplayer. Channels are themed according to its parent network and/or the broadcasting association. Some of these channels appear on digital cable, on cable FM as well as the national DAB multiplex.

 NPO SterrenNL
 NPO 3FM KX Radio
 NPO 3FM Alternative
 NPO Radio 4 Concerten
 NPO FunX Amsterdam Arab
 NPO FunX Dance
 NPO FunX Utrecht Latin
 NPO FunX Rotterdam Reggae
 NPO FunX Slow Jamz
 NPO FunX Amsterdam
 NPO FunX Rotterdam
 NPO FunX Den Haag
 NPO FunX Utrecht
 NPO FunX Den Haag Hip Hop

International
 Radio Netherlands Worldwide – Destined for international listeners. It is an independent broadcaster and is outside of the Netherlands Public Broadcasting structure, however, like NPO it receives state funding.

NPO Start (Plus)
NPO Start is an online video on demand service accessible through the NPO Start website and through the apps for Android, iOS and Smart TV. NPO Start is free of charge and offers a variety of programmes shown on NPO 1, NPO 2 and NPO 3 the past 7 days. There is a subscription premium service as well that is called NPO Plus. This service allows viewers to watch shows and TV series that were broadcast more than 7 days ago. There are also no commercial breaks.

NPO Start launched on 4 July 2017. It replaced Uitzending Gemist launched in 2003.

Regional broadcasters
In addition to the national system, each Dutch province also had a broadcasting corporation supplying its own programming to its television and radio stations from 1989 to 2021.

  (Limburg)
 NH (North Holland)
 Omroep Brabant (North Brabant)
 Omrop Fryslân (Friesland)
 Omroep Zeeland (Zeeland)
  (Drenthe)
  (Flevoland)
 Omroep Gelderland (Gelderland)
 RTV Utrecht (Utrecht)
 RTV Noord (Groningen)
 AT5 (Amsterdam) (Partly commercial)
  (Overijssel)
 RTV Rijnmond (Greater Rotterdam region)
 Omroep West (South Holland)

See also
 Television in the Netherlands
 Digital television in the Netherlands
 Media of the Netherlands
 List of radio stations in the Netherlands
 Programadora – a similar system in Colombia that utilized private companies to provide programmes to the state broadcaster

References

External links

 
 Official website of NPO (Nederlandse Publieke Omroep)
 ThreeNL, a selection of programmes in English, by several different broadcasters
 Live Radio
 List of public broadcasters with websites (Dutch)
 Media act and media policy — Government.nl
 TV and on-demand audiovisual services in Netherlands — MAVISE

Publicly funded broadcasters
Dutch public broadcasting organisations

Dutch-language television networks
European Broadcasting Union members
Radio stations established in 1923
Mass media companies established in 1923
Television channels and stations established in 1951
1923 establishments in the Netherlands
State media